Matrix most commonly refers to:
 Matrix (mathematics), a rectangular array of numbers, symbols or expressions
 The Matrix (franchise), an American media franchise developed from
 The Matrix, a 1999 science-fiction action film
 "The Matrix", a fictional setting, a virtual reality environment, within the franchise

Matrix (or its plural form matrices) may also refer to:

Science and mathematics 
 Matrix (mathematics), algebraic structure, extension of vector into 2 dimensions
 Matrix (logic), part of a formula in prenex normal form
 Matrix (biology), the material in between a eukaryotic organism's cells
 Matrix (chemical analysis), the non-analyte components of a sample
 Matrix (geology), the fine-grained material in which larger objects are embedded
 Matrix (composite), the constituent of a composite material
 Hair matrix, produces hair
 Nail matrix, part of the nail in anatomy

Technology 
 Matrix (mass spectrometry), a compound that promotes the formation of ions
 Matrix (numismatics), a tool used in coin manufacturing
 Matrix (printing), a mould for casting letters
 Matrix (protocol), an open standard for real-time communication
 Matrix (record production), or master, a disc used in the production of phonograph records
 Matrix number, of a gramophone record
 Diode matrix, a two-dimensional grid of intersecting diodes
 Keyboard matrix circuit, a wire grid for determining which key has been pressed on a keyboard
 Variable-message sign, known as matrix signs in the UK

Arts and entertainment

Fictional entities 
 Matrix (comics), two comic book characters
 Matrix (Doctor Who), a computer system on the planet Gallifrey
 Matrix, a character from the Canadian animated TV series ReBoot
 Matrix (Neuromancer), a virtual-reality dataspace from the novel
 John Matrix, hero of the 1985 film Commando
 Irving Joshua Matrix, a fictitious creation of Martin Gardner

Film and television 
 Matrix (TV series), a 1993 Canadian fantasy series
 Matrix (talk show), a 2005–2012 Italian news and talk show
 Matrix of Leadership, in the Transformers franchise

Games 
 The Matrix: Path of Neo, a 2005 action-adventure video game
 The Matrix Online, a 2005 online multiplayer video game

Literature 
 Matrix (Perry and Tucker novel), a 1998 Doctor Who novel by Robert Perry and Mike Tucker
 Matrix (Groff novel), a 2021 novel by Lauren Groff
 The Matrix (magazine), published by the Association for Women in Communications
 The Matrix, a 1994 novel by Denis MacEoin as Jonathan Aycliffe
 Matrix (journal), a journal on printing published by Whittington Press

Music 
 Matrix (band), an American jazz-fusion ensemble
 Matrix (musician), a British producer and DJ
 Matrix (music), an element in musical variations that remains unchanged
 matrix, a 2000 album by Ryoji Ikeda
 Matrix (EP), by B.A.P, 2015
 "Matrix", a song by Chick Corea from the 1968 album Now He Sings, Now He Sobs
 "Matrix", a song by Kate Pierson from the 2015 album Guitars and Microphones
 The Matrix (production team), a pop-music production team
 The Matrix (The Matrix album), 2009

Businesses and organisations 
 Matrix Business Technologies or Matrix Telecom, Inc., an American telecommunications firm
 Matrix Chambers, a set of barristers' chambers in London and Geneva
 Matrix Feminist Design Co-operative, a London-based architectural collective, 1980–1994
 Matrix Games, an American video game publisher
 Matrix Partners, an American private equity investment firm
 Matrix Software, or Matrix Corporation, a Japanese video game developer
 Matrix (club), a Berlin nightclub opened in 1996
 The Matrix (club), a San Francisco nightclub, 1965–1972
 The Matrix Theatre Company, in Los Angeles, California, US
 Matrix Concepts, a Malaysian property developer

People 
 David Krejčí (born 1986), Czech ice hockey player nicknamed "The Matrix"
 Shawn Marion (born 1978), American basketball player nicknamed "The Matrix"
 Marco Materazzi (born 1973), Italian footballer nicknamed "Matrix"

Transportation 
 Hyundai Matrix, a multi-purpose road vehicle
 Toyota Matrix, a compact hatchback car
 PA-46R-350T Matrix, a version of the Piper PA-46 aircraft

Other uses 
 Multistate Anti-Terrorism Information Exchange (MATRIX), an American data mining system
 Matrix (magic trick), a close-up magic coin and card trick
 Matrix, a brand name of veterinary progestin altrenogest
 Oberheim Matrix synthesizers, music keyboards
 Castle Matrix, near Rathkeale, County Limerick, Ireland

See also 

 
 
 
  
  
 Matrice (disambiguation)